Park Ye-eun (born 28 May 1996) is a South Korean ice hockey player.

Career
She competed in the 2018 Winter Olympics as part of a unified team of 35 players drawn from both North and South Korea. The team's coach was Sarah Murray and the team was in Group B competing against Switzerland, Japan and Sweden.

References

1996 births
Living people
Ice hockey players at the 2018 Winter Olympics
South Korean women's ice hockey defencemen
Olympic ice hockey players of South Korea
Winter Olympics competitors for Korea
Ice hockey players at the 2017 Asian Winter Games